The men's épée was one of eight fencing events on the fencing at the 1960 Summer Olympics programme. It was the thirteenth appearance of the event. The competition was held from 5 to 6 September 1960. 79 fencers from 32 nations competed. Each nation was limited to three fencers. The event was won by Giuseppe Delfino of Italy, the nation's sixth consecutive victory in the men's épée (twice as many all-time as the nation with the next most, France with three). Delfino, who had taken silver in 1956, was the seventh man to win multiple medals in the event. Silver went to Allan Jay of Great Britain and bronze to Bruno Habārovs of the Soviet Union, the first-ever medal in the event for both nations. It was the first time during Italy's gold-medal streak that the nation did not have a second medalist as well.

Background

This was the 13th appearance of the event, which was not held at the first Games in 1896 (with only foil and sabre events held) but has been held at every Summer Olympics since 1900.

Two of the eight finalists from the 1956 Games returned: silver medalist Giuseppe Delfino of Italy and eighth-place finisher Rolf Wiik of Finland. The other two members of Italy's 1956 medal-sweeping squad (gold medalist Carlo Pavesi and bronze medalist Edoardo Mangiarotti) competed in the team event, but not the individual. The reigning (1959) World Champion was Bruno Habārovs of the Soviet Union, with Allan Jay of Great Britain second and Giuseppe Delfino third. The previous World Champions, Armand Mouyal of France (1957) and Bill Hoskyns of Great Britain (1958), were also competing in Rome.

Lebanon, Monaco, Morocco, New Zealand, and Tunisia each made their debut in the event. Belgium and the United States each appeared for the 12th time, tied for most among nations.

Competition format 

The competition used a pool play format, with each fencer facing the other fencers in the pool in a round robin. There were significant changes from previous tournaments, however. The competition expanded to five rounds for the first time. Bouts were to 5 touches (an innovation retained from 1956), except that now (for the first time) ties were not permitted so that double-touches for the 5th and subsequent points resulted in the match continuing until one fencer won a point. Barrages were used to break ties necessary for advancement. However, only as much fencing was done as was necessary to determine advancement, so some bouts never occurred if the fencers advancing from the pool could be determined. Byes for team event finalists were eliminated; all fencers started in the first round. The competition involved 5 rounds:

 Round 1: 12 pools, 6 or 7 fencers to a pool, top 3 advance (total 36 advancing)
 Round 2: 6 pools, 6 fencers to a pool, top 4 advance (total 24 advancing)
 Quarterfinals: 4 pools, 6 fencers to a pool, top 3 advance (total 12 advancing)
 Semifinals: 2 pools, 6 fencers to a pool, top 4 advance (total 8 advancing)
 Final: 1 pool, 8 fencers

Schedule

All times are Central European Time (UTC+1)

Results

Round 1

The top three fencers in each pool advanced.

Round 1 Pool A

With Gonsior and Echeverry tied for 3rd place at 3–2, the two men fenced each other again for the right to advance. Echeverry had won the initial bout between the two in pool play, but Gonsior won the rematch 5–4 and advanced to the next round along with Guittet and Pickworth.

 Barrage

Round 1 Pool B

Vasin of Yugoslavia was entered in this pool, but did not start. The bout between Sákovics and Achten was cancelled as unnecessary.

Round 1 Pool C

Round 1 Pool D

The Kausz–Martínez and Saykali–Ramos bouts were cancelled; neither could affect qualification.

Round 1 Pool E

With a three-way tie for 3rd place, a barrage was conducted to assign the final advancement place. In the initial pool play, the three tied fencers had each gone 1–1 against the others (Dehez beat Spinella, who beat Pakarinen, who beat Dehez). In the barrage, Dehez again defeated Spinella, though it was a closer match the second time. Dehez then also beat Pakarinen to avenge his group loss. Because the two victories for Dehez ensured his qualification over the other two fencers, Spinella and Pakarinen did not face each other in the barrage.

 Barrage

Round 1 Pool F

Three bouts were cancelled as they would not affect qualification.

Round 1 Pool G
There was a three-way tie for 2nd place, so a barrage was held to determine the two fencers who would advance along with the leader, Jay. Annabi lost each of the first two bouts of the barrage, making the third bout unnecessary.

 Barrage

Round 1 Pool H

Gruber of Venezuela was entered in this pool but withdrew before competition began. After a three-way tie for 3rd place in the round-robin, a barrage was held. Neuber defeated both Dwinger and Fujimaki to guarantee his advancement; the latter two did not fence each other. 

 Barrage

Round 1 Pool I

The Kostava–Wiik bout was cancelled as unnecessary; both fencers would advance regardless of the result. Similarly, the Ramadan–Roldán and Soeratman–Díez bouts would not have given any of those fencers enough wins to reach 3rd place and were cancelled.

Round 1 Pool J

Glos and Margolis tied for 3rd and fenced off; Margolis had won the initial bout, but Glos was the victor in the barrage and earned advancement to the next round.

 Barrage

Round 1 Pool K

There was a three-way tie for 3rd, requiring a barrage. Hoskyns won the first two bouts against Theisen and Stone, making the third bout between those two fencers irrelevant.

 Barrage

Round 1 Pool L

Abrahamsson and Almada tied for 3rd and fenced off; Abrahamsson repeated his round-robin victory over Almada to advance to the next round. The bout between Mouyal and Gábor was cancelled as unnecessary.

 Barrage

Round 2 

The top four fencers in each pool advanced.

Round 2 Pool A

The Guittet–Breda bout was unnecessary and not fenced.

Round 2 Pool B

Two bouts (Sákovics–Glos and Pellegrino–Pickworth) were cancelled as unnecessary to determine advancement.

Round 2 Pool C

Two bouts (Abrahamsson–Kostava and Delfino–Dehez) were cancelled as unnecessary for determining advancement.

Round 2 Pool D

The Rehbinder–Fernandes bout was cancelled as unnecessary for determining advancement. Dreyfus and Wiik each finished at 2–3; the Official Report does not mention a barrage or how the tie between the two for 4th place was otherwise broken.

Round 2 Pool E

The Habārovs–Gnaier and Pelling–Gutenkauf bouts were cancelled as unnecessary for determining advancement.

Round 2 Pool F

Amez-Droz and Mouyal tied for 4th at 2–3 and fenced off in a barrage for advancement. Mouyal, who had won the round-robin bout against Amez-Droz, won again in the barrage.

 Barrage

Quarterfinals 

The top three fencers in each pool advanced.

Quarterfinal A 

There was a three-way tie for 2nd place, resulting in a barrage for the 2 available advancement spots. Kurczab lost both of the first two bouts, rendering the third bout (between Habārovs and Jay) unnecessary.

 Barrage

Quarterfinal B 

The Dreyfus–Kostava bout was cancelled as unnecessary to determining advancement.

Quarterfinal C 

The Glos–Guittet bout was cancelled as unnecessary to determining advancement.

Quarterfinal D 

There was a four-way tie for 1st place, so a barrage was needed between those four fencers to determine the three who would advance. Chernushevich lost to all three of the other fencers, making him the one from the barrage not to advance.

 Barrage

Semifinals

The top four fencers in each pool advanced.

Semifinal A 

Achten and Pellegrino tied at 2–3 and had to fence-off. Pellegrino had won the round-robin bout, but Achten won the barrage.

 Barrage

Semifinal B 

There was a three-way tie for 4th place, necessitating a barrage for the last advancement place. When the three fencers again tied at 1–1, they were ranked by fewest touches received, giving Breda the victory within the barrage.

 Barrage

Final 

The final pool resulted in 3 sets of ties: Delfino and Jay at 5–2 for gold and silver, Habārovs and Sákovics at 4–3 for bronze and 4th place, and Achten, Dreyfus, and Mouyal at 3–4 for 5th through 7th place. The medal ties were broken via barrage. Delfino, who had defeated Jay 6–5 in the round-robin, defeated him again 5–2 in the barrage to take the gold medal. Both bouts between Habārovs and Sákovics went past five touches due to double-hits; Sákovics won in the round-robin 7–6, but Habārovs prevailed in the barrage 8–7.

The three-way tie for 5th, 6th, and 7th places was broken not by a barrage, but by tie-breakers within the round-robin results. The fencer with the fewest touches received in victories was ranked best; this was Achten (to take 5th place), whose wins had been 5–1, 5–3, and 5–4 (8 touches received). Dreyfus and Mouyal each had received 9 touches in their victories (Dreyfus won by 6–5, 5–1, and 5–3 scores; all three of Mouyal's victories were 5–3). The next tie-breaker was touches given in losses. Dreyfus here prevailed, taking 6th place; he had scored 2, 5, 4, and 3 touches (14 total) in his losses, while Mouyal had given 5, 2, 2, and 1 (10 total) in his.

 Barrages for gold and bronze

Overall standings

References

Epee men
Men's events at the 1960 Summer Olympics